Mathew Stephen Walker, better known by the stage name Julio Bashmore, is an English house music producer and DJ.

Discography

Albums
 2015: "Knockin' Boots" (Broadwalk Records)

Singles and EPs
 2009: Julio Bashmore EP (Dirtybird Records)
 2010: "Chazm / Footsteppin'" (Ten Thousand Yen)
 2010: "Batak Groove" (Soul Motive)
 2011: "Everyone Needs a Theme Tune" (PMR Records)
 2011: "Batty Knee Dance" (3024)
 2011: "Riff Wrath" (Futureboogie Recordings)
 2011: "Father Father" feat. Javeon McCarthy (Futureboogie Recordings)
 2012: "Au Seve" (Broadwalk Records)
 2012: "Husk" (Broadwalk Records)
 2013: "Mirror Song" (Broadwalk Records)
 2014: "Peppermint" feat. Jessie Ware (Broadwalk Records)
 2014: "Simple Love" (Broadwalk Records)
 2015: "Rhythm of Auld" (Broadwalk Records)

References

External links
 SoundCloud

Living people
English record producers
Musicians from Bristol
Electronic dance music DJs
Year of birth missing (living people)
DJs from Bristol